The 2013 FIU Panthers football team represented Florida International University (FIU) during the 2013 NCAA Division I FBS football season. They were led by first year head coach Ron Turner and played their home games at FIU Stadium. This was their first year as a member of Conference USA in the East Division and they finished the season with a  record.

Schedule

References

FIU
FIU Panthers football seasons
FIU Panthers football team